Pedro Sousa was the defending champion but chose not to defend his title.

Geoffrey Blancaneaux won the title after defeating Tseng Chun-hsin 3–6, 6–3, 6–2 in the final.

Seeds

Draw

Finals

Top half

Bottom half

References

External links
Main draw
Qualifying draw

Maia Challenger - 1